= Gustav Linkvist =

Estonian lawyer and politician

Gustav Linkvist (forename spelled also as Kustav, surname as Linquist; 13 January 1884 Kolga Parish Harju County – 1936) was an Estonian lawyer and politician.

1917-1918 he was Executive of the Nutrition Department (Estonian: toitlustusosakonna juhataja) of the Päts provincial cabinet.
